Laurence Acton (died 1410) was an English politician who was MP for Newcastle upon Tyne in 1386, 1391, September 1397, and 1399. The son of the MP of the same name, his grandfather and uncle were both MPs named William Acton. He was also bailiff (1385 to 1393), justice of the peace (26 December 1390), and mayor (1393-1396) of the aforementioned town.

References

14th-century births
1410 deaths
English MPs 1386
English MPs 1391
English MPs September 1397
English MPs 1399
14th-century English politicians
Bailiffs
Mayors of Newcastle upon Tyne
English justices of the peace
Politicians from Newcastle upon Tyne